Sundara Purushan is a 1996 Tamil-language film starring Livingston and Rambha in lead role and directed by Sabapathy Dekshinamurthy. Sundara Purushan dealt with the serious issue of unwilling marriages but with a comical undertone from start to finish. Livingston also wrote the story and the screenplay for the movie. The movie was remade in Kannada as Chanappa Channegowda starring BC Patil, in Telugu as Andala Ramudu in 2006 starring Sunil & Aarti Agarwal and in Odia in 2012 as Something Something.

Plot
Ganesan (Livingston) has tremendous love for his maternal cousin Valli (Rambha) right from his childhood, and desires to marry her. Things go wrong for him when his mother dies when he is 8 years old; his father, who is the richest landlord in their village, marries another woman which he dislikes and runs away from home after months of torture from his dad and step-mom. He returns home (to his grandmother) after 17 years for his father's death. He even accepts his brother (Vadivelu) born to his stepmom.

Ganesan's love for Valli remains unchanged  and had returned home after so long time only to win her love and marry her.  On the contrary, Valli loves another person Raja, who is a graduate, orphan and also jobless. Her father dislikes this; he lays a condition that he would agree for their marriage only if Raja finds a job.

Ignorant of the fact, but with good intention, Ganesan offers a job to Raja. Later, he learns about the fact and gets despaired. In such a circumstance, Vadivelu resolves to unite his brother with Valli. Vadivelu tactfully implicates Raghu in a murder attempt case and sends him to prison on the day of marriage, minutes before the rituals. In such a distressing condition, Valli's father, with no other option remaining, pleads with Ganesan to marry Valli. He readily agrees and marries her.

But Ganesan feels guilty of cheating Valli and keeps distance with her. Valli, although not interested in this wedding, slowly starts liking Ganesan's good character. Three months pass by and one day Valli overhears Ganesan's conversation with his brother and finds out the truth. She gets angry and locks herself in a room. Ganesan tries to convince her but in vain. Ganesan decides to save Raja and informs the truth to police following which Raja is released from prison. Ganesan also convinces Raja to marry Valli promising that there was no relationship between him despite three months of married life. Raja agrees to marry Valli.

As per the village custom, a function is organized where Valli needs to remove her mangalayam tied by Ganesan which will be followed by her wedding with Raja. But Valli vomits before the function which makes Raja suspicious about her relationship with Ganesan. Raja wants the wedding plans to be cancelled. Valli reveals that she pretended to vomit to just check Raja's trust on her. As he has no trust in her, Valli says that Ganesan is the one who really trusts her and loves her truly. Meanwhile, Ganesan attempts suicide by jumping off a waterfall, but is saved by a net placed for cinema shooting, at the bottom. Ganesan and Valli unite in the end.

Cast

Production
Livingston told the story of "Sundara Purushan" for every producer, but producers insisted him to handle direction instead of portraying lead role, but it was R. B. Choudhary who encouraged him to portray lead role.

Music
The music was composed by Sirpy.

References

1996 films
Tamil films remade in other languages
1990s Tamil-language films
Indian comedy-drama films
Films scored by Sirpy
Films directed by Sabapathy Dekshinamurthy
Super Good Films films